LiveJasmin (company name: JWS Americas S.à r.l.) is an adult website emphasizing live streaming and related services, typically featuring nudity and sexual activity ranging from striptease and dirty talk to masturbation with sex toys and full sexual intercourse. The models are predominantly female, though there are also a fairly large number of male models. Some are cisgender, while others are transgender. Some couples model together.

Founded in 2001 by György Gattyán, the website quickly rose to prominence during the early 2000s. It is one of the largest adult camming websites in the world, competing with American cam site Chaturbate and fellow European camsite BongaCams, based in The Netherlands.

History
The website was founded in 2001 as jasmin.hu, with a focus on the domestic Hungarian audience.

In 2003, the website experienced significant growth and eventually went global with Jasmin Media Group as its holding company.

In 2014, LiveJasmin started to advertise, producing a number of TV commercials. Two of their commercials were submitted to air during the 66th Primetime Emmys but were declined by CBS, allowing them to be posted online as "banned commercials".

In 2016, LiveJasmin created the first studio and model-oriented program, known as Jasmin Certified, in order to have exclusive content.

Awards and nominations

See also
Internet pornography
List of chat websites
List of most popular websites
List of video hosting services
Porn 2.0
 BongaCams
 Chaturbate
 MyFreeCams
 Stripchat

References

Adult camming websites
Internet properties established in 2001
Luxembourgian websites
Video hosting
Hungarian erotica and pornography websites